Herman Barron (December 23, 1909 – June 11, 1978) was an American professional golfer best known for being the first Jewish golfer to win a PGA Tour event.

Biography
Barron was born in Port Chester, New York. He was one of barely a dozen professional golfers who earned their living as touring professionals in the 1930s and 1940s. His first professional win came at the 1934 Philadelphia Open Championship. On February 8, 1942, Barron became the first Jewish golfer to win an official PGA Tour event by winning the Western Open by two strokes over Henry Picard at Phoenix Golf Club in Phoenix, Arizona.

Barron was consistently among the Tour's top money winners. His best year came in 1946. In June he won the Philadelphia Inquirer Open, finished tied for fourth in the U.S. Open the following week, and in late July won the All American Open at the Tam O'Shanter Golf Course in Chicago.

Barron played on America's victorious 1947 Ryder Cup team, but was soon forced into retiring as a touring professional due to failing health. For the next 15 years, he held the position of teaching pro at the Fenway Golf Club in Westchester County, New York.

Barron returned to the touring circuit in the early 1960s and won the 1963 Senior PGA Championship.

Barron continued to work as a teaching pro until his death in Pompano Beach, Florida at the age of 68. He played a large role in the development of Israel's first golf course, in Caesarea. He is enshrined in the Westchester Hall of Fame, in the PGA Metropolitan Section Hall of Fame in New York, and in the International Jewish Sports Hall of Fame.

Professional wins (14)

PGA Tour wins (4)

Other wins (8)
1934 Philadelphia Open Championship
1937 Metropolitan PGA
1938 Westchester PGA Championship
1941 Westchester PGA Championship
1943 Westchester PGA Championship
1951 Westchester PGA Championship
1954 Westchester Open
1955 Westchester PGA Championship

Senior wins (2)

Results in major championships

NYF = tournament not yet founded
NT = no tournament
WD = withdrew
CUT = missed the half-way cut (3rd round cut in 1959 PGA Championship)
R64, R32, R16, QF, SF = round in which player lost in PGA Championship match play
"T" indicates a tie for a place

See also
List of Jewish golfers

References

American male golfers
PGA Tour golfers
Ryder Cup competitors for the United States
Jewish golfers
Golfers from New York (state)
Jewish American sportspeople
People from Port Chester, New York
People from Pompano Beach, Florida
Sportspeople from Westchester County, New York
1909 births
1978 deaths
20th-century American Jews